Roger Jones (born 1954) is an American poet.

Life
Roger Jones received his B.A. and M.A. at Sam Houston State University, before earning his Ph.D. from Oklahoma State University in 1986. He has had a wide publication record over the past thirty years that includes poetry in traditional western forms as well as haiku, tanka and haibun. Jones currently teaches at Texas State University in San Marcos, Texas, for the Texas State University MFA. He lives in San Marcos, Texas with his wife and two children.

Awards
 Texas Review Poetry Chapbook Prize, 1980
 Academy of American Poets Prize, 1984
 Texas Review Southern/Southwestern Breakthrough competition award, 1993
 Texas Review Press Poetry Prize, 2008

Works
 Remembering New London (Texas Review Press, 1981)
 Strata (Texas Review Press, 1993)
 Are We There Yet? (Texas Review Press, 2006)

References

External links
Texas State MFA Faculty Page
Haiku by Jones in Simply Haiku

1954 births
Living people
American male poets
English-language haiku poets
English-language poets
Texas State University faculty
Sam Houston State University alumni
Oklahoma State University alumni
Poets from Texas